Leon de Geus (born 24 June 1971) is a former Dutch darts player who plays in Professional Darts Corporation events.

PDC career
In January 2013, he took part in the PDC Qualifying School but failed to win a place, coming closest on the third day when he reached the last 16. De Geus qualified for the 2013 UK Open, but was beaten 5–3 by Scott Robertson in the first round. The best result of his career to date was winning through to the last 16 of the Gibraltar Darts Trophy, where he lost 6–1 to Phil Taylor. The only event De Geus could qualify for in 2014 was the German Darts Championship where he came back from 5–3 down against Steve Maish to win 6–5, before losing 6–2 against world number one Michael van Gerwen in the second round. He did not play in a PDC from April until the end of the year.

De Geus returned at Q School in January 2015 and, after failing to advance beyond the last 256 in the first three days, reached the last 16 on day four where he was beaten by Magnus Caris. Though he did not earn a PDC tour card he will still have entry into European Tour and UK Open Qualifiers in the year ahead.

References

External links
Darts Database profile

1971 births
Living people
Dutch darts players
Sportspeople from Tilburg
Professional Darts Corporation associate players